The Canal de Roanne à Digoin connects the Canal latéral à la Loire and Canal du Centre at Digoin to Roanne.

History 
This canal was needed to bypass the Loire, which offered inadequate navigable conditions, at the same time serving as a feeder to the Canal latéral à la Loire. The canal was conceded to the Compagnie Franco-Suisse, founded in 1827, and designed by engineer De Varaigne. Works started in 1831 and the canal was inaugurated in 1838. Modernisation to Freycinet standards was designed by engineer Léonce-Abel Mazoyer after the State bought back the canal from the concessionary in 1863. The canal was upgraded to Freycinet standard between 1891 and 1899. The water supply dam and reservoir was completed in 1905

Development 
The canal is now used only by private boats and some hire boats. Its development as a tourist asset for the region is actively promoted by the Association "Le Canal de Roanne à Digoin" set up in 2011.

See also
 List of canals in France

References

External links
 Projet Babel included in the references above; presentation of all French waterways ever built, by Charles Berg; history and current issues
 Canal de Roanne à Digoin navigation guide; places, ports and moorings on the canal, by the author of Inland Waterways of France, Imray
 Navigation details for 80 French rivers and canals (French waterways website section)

Roanne
Canals opened in 1838
1838 establishments in France